Count Arthur John Moore KHS (1849 – 5 January 1904) was a wealthy Roman Catholic Irish nationalist politician.

Background and education
Born in Liverpool, Moore was the son of Charles Moore who had served as Member of Parliament (MP) for Tipperary from 1865 to 1869. He was educated at Ushaw College, Durham. He married Mary Lucy Clifford of Hatherton Hall, Stafford, daughter of Sir Charles Clifford, on 7 February 1877. They resided at Mooresfort, Lattin, County Tipperary, Ireland.

Political career
Moore was elected at the 1874 general election as a Home Rule League MP for Clonmel, holding the seat in the Parliament of the United Kingdom until the constituency's abolition for the 1885 general election. In Parliament he strongly advocated land reform, better treatment of children in workhouses, university education for Irish Catholics, and Home Rule.

He returned to the House of Commons briefly as an Irish Parliamentary Party MP, after winning a by-election on 16 February 1899 for the Londonderry City, but held the seat only until the general election the following year. He also held the offices of Deputy Lieutenant, Justice of the Peace and was High Sheriff in 1877. He was affiliated with the section of the Irish Party led by T.M. Healy and his defeat as MP for Londonderry city in 1900 was partly due to the hostility of the dominant faction led by John Dillon.

Papal honours
Moore was made a Knight Commander of the Order of St. Gregory and Chamberlain of Honour to the Pope and was created a Papal Count by Pope Leo XIII in 1879.

Arthur John Moore was a Knight of the Equestrian Order of the Holy Sepulchre.

Philanthropy

Moore financed the building of Ferryhouse Industrial School for Catholic boys near Clonmel. In 1884 he handed it over to the charge of the Rosminian Order to be run by them. He financed the foundation, donating the land and buildings for Mount St Joseph Abbey at Roscrea, where he is buried.

References

Sources

External links 

1849 births
1904 deaths
Papal counts
Home Rule League MPs
UK MPs 1874–1880
UK MPs 1880–1885
UK MPs 1895–1900
Irish Parliamentary Party MPs
Politicians from County Tipperary
Knights of the Holy Sepulchre
Politicians from Liverpool
Members of the Parliament of the United Kingdom for County Tipperary constituencies (1801–1922)
Members of the Parliament of the United Kingdom for County Londonderry constituencies (1801–1922)
Anti-Parnellite MPs